Ancistrus leoni is a species of catfish native to South America, specifically the Amazon basin and the Orinoco Basin.

Description 
Ancistrus leoni is around 81.6 millimeters long. It can survive in temperatures of 25–29 degrees Celsius. The fish was named after Oscar León Mata.

References 

leoni
Taxa named by Jonathan W. Armbruster
Fish described in 2019
Fish of South America